This is a listing of first-place, second-place, third-place and fourth-place finishers, and the number of starters in the Kentucky Derby, a Grade I American Thoroughbred race run at  miles on dirt for three-year-olds. It is the first leg of the American Triple Crown, run at Churchill Downs in Louisville, Kentucky.

A † designates a Triple Crown Winner.

Note:  D. Wayne Lukas swept the 1995 Triple Crown with two different horses.

*In 2019, Maximum Security finished first, but was disqualified to 17th for fouling War of Will.

**In 1984, Gate Dancer finished fourth, but was disqualified for fouling Fali Time, who was then moved up from 5th to 4th place.

***In 1968, Dancer's Image finished first, but was disqualified after a post-race urine sample revealed traces of a banned drug in the horse. The drug in question - phenylbutazone - illegal at the time, is now legal for use on racehorses in many states, including Kentucky. Forward Pass was placed first.

**** In 2021, Medina Spirit finished first, but was disqualified after a post-race urine sample revealed traces of a banned drug, betamethasone, in the horse. Mandaloun was placed first.

See also
 Kentucky Oaks top three finishers
 List of graded stakes at Churchill Downs

References

External links
Kentucky Derby website

Grade 1 stakes races in the United States
Flat horse races for three-year-olds
Triple Crown of Thoroughbred Racing
Churchill Downs
Kentucky Derby
Louisville, Kentucky-related lists
Lists of horse racing results